(born November 17, 1976), better known as his wrestling persona  and formerly , is a freelance Japanese professional wrestler. Though best known for wrestling under a mask, he also regularly works unmasked under the ring name Kikuzawa (stylized in all capital letters), representing Tokyo Gurentai. Kikuzawa has also made appearances in North America, competing in promotions such as Chikara, Pro Wrestling Guerrilla (PWG), Ring of Honor (ROH) and Impact Wrestling.

Career
Kikuzawa started his wrestling career in 1994, wrestling under his birth name for Japanese hardcore wrestling promotions including FMW and W*ING, he eventually signed with Osaka Pro Wrestling and Dramatic Dream Team (DDT), where he continued to use his real name while competing for DDT.

While wrestling for Osaka Pro, he began wearing a mask as a character named Ebessan based on Ebisu, the Japanese god of good fortune. Using comedic spots to get over with the crowd, Ebessan was immediately accepted by the Osaka Pro crowd. He moved up the ranks quickly and soon made Osaka Pro his full-time home in 2001. Ebessan became particularly well known for his rivalry with Kuishinbo Kamen, the two having many fun and comedic matches. They even worked as a tag team from time to time.

As Ebessan was OPW's registered trademark, Kikuzawa was forced to give away his Ebessan character to  before leaving the company in 2005. Kikuzawa modified his character and used the name Ebetaro, but he would end up settling down for a new, original gimmick. He became Kikutaro, a masked, exaggerated self-parodic alter ego who behaved both goofy and self-important, wearing always colored tracksuits and baseball caps. He kept most of his comedic spots and impersonations, however, as well as his feud with Kuishinbo Kamen, adding now the new Ebessan to the enmity.

In 2006, he began competing for All Japan Pro Wrestling, where he continued to work through the years. He often wrestled in the opening match, but also offered himself as an ally to Keiji Mutoh in his feud against Voodoo Murders and other factions.

In December 2016, Kikutaro moved from Japan to the United States. He currently resides in Las Vegas, Nevada.

Tributes
Kikuzawa has been known to do tributes to many wrestlers throughout his career, either through subtle imitations or by doing full imitations of their gimmick. He typically includes a tribute to Keiji Mutoh in his matches by performing Mutoh's signature elbow drop and Shining Wizard, as well as using Mutoh's "love" pose. Kikuzawa has also done many tributes to wrestlers in "borrowing" their gimmicks by dressing in similar attire and performing their signature moves. Kikuzawa has famously imitated Stan Hansen, Abdullah the Butcher, Jyushin Thunder Liger, Keiji Mutoh, Triple H, Bret Hart, Cactus Jack, Bill Goldberg, Kurt Angle, Ric Flair and Yuji Nagata.

Championships and accomplishments
Compound Pro Wrestling
Oklahoma X Division Championship (1 time)
Dragon Gate
Open the Owarai Gate Championship (2 times)
Open the Owarai Twin Gate Championship (1 time) – with Don Fujii 
Dramatic Dream Team
Ironman Heavymetalweight Championship (8 times)
Frontier Martial-Arts Wrestling
Barbed Wire Street Fight Six Man Tag Team Championship (2 times)  –  with Atsushi Onita and Okumura (1), and Atsushi Onita and Exciting Yoshida (1)
Impact Wrestling
Gravy Train Turkey Trot (2018) – with KM, Alisha Edwards, Fallah Bahh, Dezmond Xavier
Mobius
El Mejor de Máscara Championship (1 time)
Nosawa Bom-Ba-Ye
NGF Heavyweight Championship (1 time)
Osaka Pro Wrestling
Osaka Meibutsu Sekaiichi Championship (3 times)
Osaka Pro Wrestling Battle Royal Championship (6 times)
Osaka Pro Wrestling Owarai Championship (1 time)
Pro Wrestling Illustrated
PWI ranked him #185 of the top 500 singles wrestlers in the PWI 500 in 2006
Tokyo Gurentai
Tokyo Intercontinental Tag Team Championship (1 time) – with Stalker Ichikawa
Ultimate Superstars Action
USA World Tag Team Championship (1 time) – with Hulk Puchihogan

References

External links

Online World of Wrestling profile

1977 births
Japanese male professional wrestlers
Living people
Masked wrestlers
20th-century professional wrestlers
21st-century professional wrestlers
Ironman Heavymetalweight Champions
Open the Owarai Gate Champions